China Int'l Exhibition Center station is a station on Line 15 of the Beijing Subway in Shunyi District, located along National Highway 101 (Jingmi Road) to the east of the eponymous China International Exhibition Center.

Station Layout 
The station has an elevated island platform.

Exits 
There are 4 exits, lettered A, B, C, and D. Exits A and B are accessible.

Gallery

References

External links 

Beijing Subway stations in Shunyi District
Railway stations in China opened in 2010